Ghodaghodi Municipality is a Municipality in Kailali District of Sudurpashchim Province.
Ghodaghodi lies 58 km east of Dhangadhi and 613 km west of the capital, Kathmandu. It is surrounded by Mohanyal in the north, Bhajani Municipality in the south, Bardagoriya Rural Municipality in the east and Gauriganga Municipality in the west. It is divided into 12 wards. It was established by merging Darakh, Sadepani, Ramsikhar Jhala and Pahalmanpur 4 existing village development committees.

Election Result 
2017 Nepalese local elections 

Mayoral Election

Deputy Mayor Election

See also
 Kailali District
 Sudurpashchim Province

References

Populated places in Kailali District
Municipalities in Kailali District
Nepal municipalities established in 2017